Tarlok Singh Sandhu (born 1 January 1955) is an Indian basketball player. He competed in the men's tournament at the 1980 Summer Olympics.

References

External links
 
 Olympic.org Player Profile

1955 births
Living people
Basketball players from Punjab, India
Indian men's basketball players
Olympic basketball players of India
Basketball players at the 1980 Summer Olympics